Saros cycle series 122 for lunar eclipses occurs at the moon's ascending node, every 18 years 11 and 1/3 days. It contains 74 events.

This lunar saros is linked to Solar Saros 129.

See also 
 List of lunar eclipses
 List of Saros series for lunar eclipses

Notes

External links 
 www.hermit.org: Saros 122

Lunar saros series